Terrence Adrian Clarke (September 6, 2001 – April 22, 2021) was an American college basketball player for the Kentucky Wildcats of the Southeastern Conference (SEC). Clarke was a standout Amateur Athletic Union (AAU) basketball player for Todd Quarles at Expressions Elite in Braintree, Massachusetts. He began his high school career at Rivers School before transferring to Brewster Academy, where his team won the 2019 National Prep Championships. Named a McDonald's All-American, Clarke was a consensus five-star recruit and one of the best shooting guards in the 2020 class. He played one season in college for Kentucky before declaring for the National Basketball Association (NBA) draft.

Clarke died in a car crash at the age of 19 in Los Angeles, California, on April 22, 2021, three months before the draft. In the 2021 NBA draft, he was named an honorary selection by the league.

Early life and high school career
Terrence Clarke was born on September 6, 2001, at Beth Israel Deaconess Medical Center in Boston, Massachusetts, to Osmine Clarke and Adrian Briggs. He originally attended Rivers School in Weston, Massachusetts, before he transferred to Brewster Academy after his freshman season. At Rivers, he was named to the all-New England Preparatory School Athletic Council class B team. At Brewster, he won the 2019 National Prep Championships. As a senior, Clarke averaged 18.3 points per game with 5.8 rebounds per game and three assists per game as Brewster finished with a 34–3 record before COVID-19 pandemic ended the National Prep finals. Clarke was selected for the McDonald's All-American Game, an all-star boys' basketball game which comprises many of the top-ranked American and Canadian high school basketball graduates played the same day as a counterpart girls' game, and was selected as a Sports Illustrated third-team All American, a team composed of the third-best boys high school senior players in the United States.

Recruiting
Rivals, ESPN, and 247Sports all evaluated Clarke as a five-star recruit, with Rivals and 247Sports ranking him as the eighth-best player, and ESPN as the tenth-best player in the 2020 class. On September 14, 2019, Clarke announced his commitment to Kentucky over offers from Boston College, Duke, Memphis, Texas Tech, and UCLA. He also announced that he was reclassifying to the class of 2020. Clarke was ranked as the number two player in the 2021 class before reclassifying according to ESPN.

College career
In his college debut on November 25, 2020, Clarke posted 12 points, four rebounds, four assists, and three steals in an 81–45 win over Morehead State. Due to a right leg injury, he was limited to eight games during the season, seven in non-conference play and one in the SEC tournament, making six starts and averaging 9.6 points, 2.6 rebounds and two assists per game. Clarke scored a career-high 22 points against the Georgia Tech Yellow Jackets on December 6, 2020. He finished his collegiate career with seventy-seven points over 229 minutes played. On March 19, 2021, Clarke announced that he would forgo his remaining college eligibility and declare for the 2021 NBA draft. One day prior to his death, Clarke signed with Klutch Sports Group.

Death and tributes
Following a workout with teammate Brandon Boston Jr., Clarke died on April 22, 2021, in Los Angeles, California, after being involved in a traffic collision. The Los Angeles Police Department stated that Clarke was driving at a high speed when he ran a red light, hitting a car that was turning left and then hit a pole and block wall. He was driving a 2021 Genesis GV80 without wearing his seat belt properly. He was 19 years old. Clarke's agent Rich Paul said Clarke was motivated, was in the best shape of his life, had grown to 6'8" and was putting in work to be a lottery pick in the 2021 NBA draft.

On July 29, 2021, between the 14th and 15th picks of the 2021 NBA draft, NBA Commissioner Adam Silver made Clarke a ceremonial pick, fulfilling his dream of being drafted to the NBA. Clarke's mother Osmine, brother Gavin, and sister Tatyana accepted on his behalf. For the NBA's Rising Stars Challenge during the NBA's 2021–22 All-Star weekend, his mother received an honorary jersey of Clarke's for the game.

Career statistics

College

|-
| style="text-align:left;"| 2020–21
| style="text-align:left;"| Kentucky
| 8 || 6 || 28.6 || .421 || .217 || .471 || 2.6 || 2.0 || .6 || .1 || 9.6

References

External links
Kentucky Wildcats bio
USA Basketball bio
Expressions Elite Official Website

2001 births
2021 deaths
African-American basketball players
American men's basketball players
Basketball players from Boston
Kentucky Wildcats men's basketball players
McDonald's High School All-Americans
Road incident deaths in California
Shooting guards
21st-century African-American sportspeople
Brewster Academy alumni
Rivers School alumni